is a Japanese footballer who plays for Thespakusatsu Gunma.

Club statistics
Updated to 23 February 2018.

References

External links

Profile at Giravanz Kitakyushu
Profile at Thespakusatsu Gunma

1990 births
Living people
Toyo University alumni
Association football people from Gunma Prefecture
Japanese footballers
J2 League players
Giravanz Kitakyushu players
Thespakusatsu Gunma players
Association football defenders